Persatuan Sepakbola Indonesia Probolinggo 1954 or Persipro 1954 is an Indonesian football club based in Probolinggo, East Java. They currently compete in the Liga 3.

Persipro stadium named Bayu Angga Stadium. Its location was in downtown Probolinggo.

References

External links
Persipro Probolinggo at Liga-Indonesia.co.id
Persipro Bond-U at divisiutama.co.id
 

Football clubs in Indonesia
Football clubs in East Java
Association football clubs established in 1954
1954 establishments in Indonesia